Chawngtlai is a village in the Champhai district of Mizoram, India. It is located in the Khawzawl R.D. Block.

Historical sites 
 House of Chawngtlai Chief Nikuala, who guarded the western part of Mizoram from the eastern enemies
 Sahlam, a tree where Mizo warriors hung enemy heads
 Zawlbuk ban, post bachelor quarters
 Tawlhlohpuan, the earliest Mizor warriors' clothes originated from this village
 Pasaltha Hranghleia feikibar, Spear head of the warrior Hranghlei
 Manganga lungtat, Whetting stone of Manganga, the chief blacksmith
 Manganga lung, Pictorial stone of Manganga, the chief blacksmith
 Chawngtlai, The flowering tree called Chawngtlai
 Hmar Lungtat - Whetting stone of Hmar tribe dating back to 1700 AD
 Pasaltha Hranghleia thlan - Tomb stone of brave warriors Hranghleia, who guarded the western from the eastern enemies
 Lasi lalnu Tantihchhingi Khawpuitan -  the hills of the forest fairy queen Tantinchhingi
 Lal Nikuala inthawina - Chief Nikuala’s worship place
 Tantinchhingi Khawpuitan puk - A fairy queen Tantinchhingi cave at Khawpuitan
 Thingtlang Thlanmual hmasaber - First village graveyard in Mizoram
 Hranglung - Monument by warriors in the 18th century
 Lal lungdawh - Monuments by the Chief and his family
 Lalruanga lungkahkeh - the ancient famous mizo warlock stone crushed with his arrow
 Lal Nikuala man tuma lo thawk British sipai inkulhna - The resting place of Chief Nikuala where the British Army captured him
 Mithah kawn, The last slaughter place, where the enemy warriors from Pawih tribe slaughtered the Lushei.
 Mizoram lungphun sang ber, Tallest monolith in Mizoram 24.6 feet
 Lungsen (red rock)
 Biaklawma lung, Memorial stone of biaklawma, a bachelor who guided the children in doing good and introduced the idea of the Mizoram Presbyterian’s version of babies’s Christening
 Puk ropui - The big/great cave
 Lasi rorelna puk - A cave where the forest fairies used to have council meetings, according to the legends
 Theire puk - the cave where the village priest used to give offerings to the ancient Mizo gods
 Hringei puk - The cannibal cave
 Sai Bualpui Dil - A bathing pond of the elephants

Demographics 

According to the 2011 census of India, Chawngtlai has 325 households. The effective literacy rate (i.e. the literacy rate of population excluding children aged 6 and below) is 93.44%.

References 

Villages in Khawzawl block